Guy Tzarfati (born 28 April 1979) is a retired Israeli footballer who now works as a coach. Tzarfati now works as the assistant manager of Maccabi Haifa.

Guy's father Sami and older brother Jackie were also professional footballers.

Managerial statistics

Honours
Toto Cup (2):
1998-99, 2012–13
Israel State Cup (1):
2001
Liga Leumit (1):
2006-07

External links
Profile at One
National team stats at IFA

1979 births
Living people
Israeli Jews
Israeli footballers
Maccabi Tel Aviv F.C. players
Maccabi Netanya F.C. players
Hapoel Tel Aviv F.C. players
Hapoel Ironi Kiryat Shmona F.C. players
Hapoel Petah Tikva F.C. players
Hapoel Haifa F.C. players
F.C. Ashdod players
Maccabi Netanya F.C. managers
Hapoel Petah Tikva F.C. managers
Liga Leumit players
Israeli Premier League players
Footballers from Tel Aviv
Israeli people of Moroccan-Jewish descent
Association football midfielders
Israeli football managers
Israel international footballers
Maccabi Tel Aviv F.C. non-playing staff